The Association of Finnish Culture and Identity, also known as the Finnish Alliance, is a Finnish cultural organization. The official name of The Association is in Finnish Suomalaisuuden Liitto, in German Verband für das Finnentum e. V. and in French La Ligue Finlandaise.

The Finnish Alliance was founded by writer Johannes Linnankoski in 1906. The founding date was the 100th anniversary of J.V. Snellman, a prominent national Finnish philosopher and statesman. The purpose was and is still today to awaken and to strengthen the sense of national identity, to promote Finnish, especially Finnish speaking, culture. A significant goal is to cultivate the Finnish language.

One of the most far-reaching manifestations of the Finnish Alliance’s activities was the mass fennification of family names in 1906-07. This was repeated in 1935-36 with the result of more than 200,000 people changing their family names into Finnish. The Association of Finnish Culture and Identity has played a remarkable role in Finnish cultural life. It provided the initiatives which led to the creation of the Fund for the Promotion of Finnish Literature (Suomen kulttuurirahasto), Suomi-Seura (an organization to unite the Finns abroad), and the Finnish Family Planning Association (Väestöliitto).

The President of the Finnish Alliance in 1930-32 was Urho Kekkonen, the President of Finland in 1956-81.

The Finnish Alliance is an important element in the Finnish establishment. It provides expert advice on matters such as the displaying of the Finnish flag and Finnish family names. It creates and maintains contacts between Finland and Finns living abroad. The Association of Finnish Culture and Identity is well known for emphasizing the Finnish pupils’ and students’ right to determine for themselves the foreign languages they wish to study.

In addition the Association of Finnish Culture and Identity pursues research, publishes books, sells Finnish flags made in Finland, gives lectures and is involved in many other activities in its goal to strengthen the Finnish identity.

Current board
The current chairman of the association is professor emeritus Ilmari Rostila, 1st vice chairman is Ms. Susanna Koski, and 2nd vice chairman is Mr. Sebastian Vilja

Chairmen

See also
Finnishness

References

External links
Official site

Finnish culture
Non-profit organisations based in Finland
Political organisations based in Finland